The surname McAleer is found in County Tyrone, Ulster in Ireland, moving into western regions of Scotland. It is an Anglicisation of the Gaelic Mac Giolla Uidhir or Mac Giolla Uír. It is thought to mean "son of the servant of Saint Odhar". Legend says that Saint Odhar was Saint Patrick's charioteer.

McAleer is a native Irish surname originating in County Tyrone. The original Irish Gaelic form of the surname is Mac Giolla Uidhir/Uidir. The Irish word Giolla means a youth or a lad. However, if it is used in connection with a saint then it usually means that you are a follower/servant/devotee of that saint. Mac Giolla Uidhir must either mean 'the son of the dun-coloured youth' or 'the son of the devotee of St Odhar'. St Odhar was St Patrick's charioteer. Eachdonn Mac Giolla Uidhir was the Catholic Primate of Armagh in the early 13th century (according to Patrick Woulfe), so the surname has been in Ulster for a long time, before Plantation (17th century) and even Gallowglass (14th/15th century) times. The native Irish Maguire/McGuire (Mag Uidhir) surname originated in neighbouring County Fermanagh and means 'son of Odhar' or 'son of the dun-coloured one'. Dun-coloured means light brown or fawn and I understand this is a reference to hair colour

The native Irish McAleer surname is common in south west Ulster (Tyrone, Fermanagh, Monaghan) whereas the Scottish Planter McClure surname is common in east Ulster (Antrim/Down/Armagh) and north west Ulster (Donegal/Derry). Having said all that, I am sure there must have been some intermingling of the similar sounding McAleer and McClure surnames in Ulster. It also seems likely that some of the illiterate 19th century Catholic Irish McAleer immigrants to Scotland would have had their surnames recorded as McClure.Recent DNA testing has proved the McClure's are of Scottish descent whilst the McAleer's are of Irish descent.

The McAleer's lineage R1B >  R-P312 > L21/S145 > S552 > DF13 > Z39589 > DF49/S474 > Z2980 > Z2976 > DF23 > Z2961 > Z 2956 > M-222 > DF104  >  DF105 > S588 > S603  >BY3342. BY20521. 

 S588 (483 AD) is the Haplo group for descendant's of Eogain  son of Niall of the Nine Hostages. Eogain was the progenitor of the Cenel nEogain, which is a branch of the Northern UI Neill. BY3342 is the Haplogroup associated with the Cenel Moain which is a sub branch of the Cenel nEogain. Moain son of Muiredach son of Eogain was the great grandson of  Niall of the Nine Hostages. Our name in Irish is Mac Giolla Uidhir. The McAleer's are of Irish descent and are descendants of the Cenel nEogain not Viking or Scottish which has been suggested by some.

According to FAMILIA ulster genealogical review 1990 Vol 2 No 6 on page 55 the McAleer's are Cenel Maien ( Kindred of Moen) Maien was a brother to Muiredach Mac Ercae, son of Muiredach Mac Neill, son of Eogain Mac Neill, son of Niall of The Nine Hostages, who was the eponymous ancestor of the UI Neill dynasty. Historically the ancestral lands of the clan are situated around MAG IOGHA in Donegal. Grianan of Aileach would be the ancestral home until the 14th century when the  clan was forced eastwards across the river Foyle into Tyrone and east of Strabane by the O Donnell's. Traditionally the O Gormley's were chieftain's of the clan, but there have been periods when the Lafferty's and the O Luinigh have also been chieftains. It was certainly the case in the 14th century. Today the traditional lands lie in the Sperrin mountains with places still carrying the name MHUINTER LUNIGH and AGHALANE in the Glenelly valley
</ref>

Notable McAleers
Hugh McAleer, Irish nationalist member of the House of Commons of Northern Ireland for Mid Tyrone, 1929-1941
Jimmy McAleer, American baseball player
Caolan McAleer, Northern Irish footballer
Owen McAleer, mayor of Los Angeles from 1904 till 1906
Dave McAleer, chief consultant/contributor of the Guinness Book of British Hit Singles & Albums
Declan McAleer, Irish politician
Kevin McAleer, Irish comic
Phelim McAleer, Irish filmmaker
William McAleer, Irish-American politician

Medieval spelling variations
Spellings include McAlear, MacClure, MacLure, MacCloor, McLeur, McCloor and others.

References